After Words is a 2015 American film shot in Costa Rica.

Plot
A librarian who has lost her job and is suicidal decides to take a final wonderful trip to Costa Rica before swallowing a bottle of pills. Once there, she meets a younger man, a vibrant tour guide who takes her to all the beautiful places, and becomes intrigued by her aloof intellectualism. He works hard to draw her out, to get her to embrace the Costa Rican motto, "Pura Vida," which means "pure life," but in a broader sense encompasses the national exuberance for living. She inspires him to read the first book he has ever read, and he encourages her to have some fun, relax, and loosen up for the first time in too many years. An unusual but lovely romantic relationship evolves.

Cast
 Marcia Gay Harden 
 Huguette Urhausen
 Ron Canada  
 Óscar Jaenada
 Jenna Ortega

Reception
Rotten Tomatoes, a review aggregator, reports that 38% of eight surveyed critics gave the film a positive review; the average rating is 5.6/10.

References

External links

2015 films
Films shot in Costa Rica
Midlife crisis films
2015 drama films
American drama films
2010s English-language films
2010s American films